Malloderma kuegleri is a species of beetle in the family Cerambycidae. It was described by Holzschuh in 2010. It is known from Laos.

References

Saperdini
Beetles described in 2010